Dechantskirchen is a municipality in the district of Hartberg-Fürstenfeld in Styria, Austria. At 1. January 2015 it was expanded by a part (Katastralgemeinde Schlag) of the to this date existing immediate neighbor municipality Schlag bei Thalberg within the scope of the Gemeindestrukturreform.

Geographie

Geographical position 
Dechantskirchen is placed in the northeast of the district Hartberg-Fürstenfeld and also of Styria. The municipality resides approximately 15 km north of the district capital Hartberg. The highest place of the municipality territory is the Hochkogel (1.314 m), the moust southern one thousand mountain of the Wechsel.

Municipality structure 
The municipality is composed of three Katastralgemeinden Dechantskirchen, Hohenau, Kroisbach und Schlag respectively of eight small towns (population 1. January 2019):

 Bergen (106) mit der Rotte Drei Häuser
 Burgfeld (125) mit Höttling
 Dechantskirchen (665)
 Hohenau am Wechsel (100) mit der Streusiedlung Jockl im Hof
 Kroisbach (391) mit Killer
 Limbach (25)
 Schlag bei Thalberg (390) mit Lehen und Thalberg-Siedlung
 Stögersbach (240)

Annexations 
At 1. January 1967 the municipality Hohenau am Wechsel was incorporated to Dechantskirchen.

History 
Because of many archeological evidences, there is reason to expect that human settlement existed already in prehistoric time, like 3000 to 1500 before Christ, at the arey of Dechanstkirchen.

Culture and sights 

Also look at the list of as historic protected monuments of Dechantskirchen.

 Pfarrkirche Dechantskirchen
 Burg Thalberg

Infrastructure 
Dechanstkirchen can be reached by train and by car. It resides at the railway track Thermenbahn and the Wechsel Straße B 54.

The airports Graz and Vienna are each around 100 km remote.

References

Cities and towns in Hartberg-Fürstenfeld District